Women living in Myanmar continue to face barriers to equality. After forty years of isolation, myths about the state of women's rights in Myanmar (Burma) were centered around the conception that Burmese women face less gender discrimination and have more rights than women in surrounding Southeast Asian nations. After Myanmar opened its borders in 2010, gender discrimination began to be seen by the international community. Currently, a variety of organizations--both domestic and international--strive to educate people that this is a misconception to better make strides towards protecting women's rights in Myanmar.

Myanmar's legal framework, traditions, and religious beliefs protect women's rights. However, many concepts of the traditional role of women continue to keep women in Myanmar from gaining advancement. Traditionally, a woman in Myanmar is responsible for her family's well-being, while the husband earns the income for the household. Women continue to remain underrepresented in government positions, and women living in rural areas of the country face fewer opportunities for advancement than women in more urban areas of the country. Additionally, women belonging to ethnic minority groups face added discrimination and barriers to access, particularly those who are not Buddhist.

Governmental strides towards women's equality have been made, particularly in establishing institutional agencies to address women's representation. Additionally, there have been changes centering general women's rights and women's representation. Despite this, there are still large cultural barriers, as well as additional disparities in access for women who are rural or ethnic minorities.

Constitutional Rights 

Myanmar’s Constitution (Section 347) includes the guarantee of equal rights and equal legal protection to all persons and (Section 348) does not discriminate against any Myanmar citizen on the basis of sex. Myanmar has been an active participant of the Association of Southeast Asian Nations (ASEAN) Committee on Women as well as the ASEAN Commission on Protection and Promotion of the Rights of Women and Children in 2010.

However the United Nations Committee on the Elimination of Discrimination against Women (CEDAW Committee) has expressed concern with about women's rights in Myanmar because Myanmar's active participation in advocating for women’s rights has translated to a belief that there is gender equality in the country. But the 2008 Constitution of Myanmar contains references to women mostly as mother which reinforces the stereotype of a woman's role being that of a mother and caretaker in need of protection. The current lack of measures to achieve gender equality in both domestic legislation and the Constitution is of concern to the Committee on the Elimination of Discrimination against Women.

Representation in Government and Politics 
Women in Myanmar remain largely underrepresented in elected positions. Women have been historically underrepresented, and while women's officeholding has seen some recent increase, women's rights activists in Myanmar argue the government has been unwilling to promote women's representation.

In the 2020 election, representation for women in the Myanmar's National Parliament increased, however not as much as what many women's rights activists anticipated: in 2018, the percentage of women in National Parliament rested at only 11.32%, but saw an increase to 16.83% of the seats in 2020. There are no resources at female candidates' disposal for female candidate-specific trainings from any source. However, women received the most support overall from Myanmar's political parties, particularly in areas such as campaign financing and voter outreach. Myanmar has used a plurality, first-past-the-post electoral system since 2010. Following the 2020 elections and what many women's rights activists considered a smaller increase in women's representation than expected, activists are calling for a proportional representation electoral system.

Women are also severely underrepresented in local government. Prior to the 2020 elections, women were less than 1% of Ward/Village Tract Administrators. Ward and village public meetings often have a strong attendance of female attendees, however women are unlikely to hold leadership positions or even voice opinion when they attend the meetings.

Education

The equal right to education for men and women is guaranteed by Myanmar’s Constitution. In 2008, Myanmar's new Constitution prioritized education after years of under prioritization of education in the previous military rule. Between 2008 and 2013, because of the government's encouragement of education policies, Myanmar saw a rise in the number of girls attaining education. Currently, there are more women than men in Myanmar's education system. The literacy rate for adult women is 86% compared to just over 90% for men. Education is co-educational at all levels. Despite the progress, there are continued traditional cultural barriers that prevent women from capitalizing on their education attainment.

There are extreme disparities between urban and rural educational performance. The Shan Stateregion of Myanmar has the lowest female literacy rates at 59.4%.Additionally while a growing proportion of women are pursuing higher education this number does not match the future employment fate of women, where men make the larger proportion of those in the workforce. Moreover, women still do not occupy senior levels of economic decision making, despite their high education.

Health

In 2010, Burmese women’s life expectancy was 69.9 years old. Myanmar has a high mortality rate with 200 deaths per 100,000 live births, however an improvement from the 520 deaths per 100,000 births in 1990. Leading causes of maternal death according to the government’s 2006-2011 National Health Plan are postpartum hemorrhage, eclampsia, and complications from unsafe abortions. The majority of maternal deaths occur at home, only 38% of women with labor complications were referred to a hospital in 2010, and only 24% reached the hospital, the other 14% died en route because of delayed referral or transportation delays.

While abortion is illegal in Myanmar, around 10 percent of all maternal deaths are reported to be abortion-related. There is a 20% unmet need for contraception among married women. The lack of sex education across the country results in a high adolescent fertility rate of 16.9%.

Cultural taboos around women’s sexuality in Myanmar prevent open conversation regarding sexual and reproductive health and rights among women in the country. If a woman has experienced sexual assault prior to marriage, it is common that once married, they have little control over sexual relations within the marriage. Moreover, most women who reported incidents of sexual violence entered into marriage under conditions of social or economic vulnerability. This highlights a mentality of male entitlement over their wives’ bodies. In 2013, it is estimated that 69,489 of females in Myanmar had HIV accounting for 34% of the total HIV cases in Myanmar.

Marriage and Family

Usually Burmese women have the freedom to choose their own husband, despite the continued presence of matchmaking traditions and parental say in the decision that occasionally still occur. Legally one can get married at 20 years of age in Myanmar. In 1973 the average age for a female to marry at was 21.2 years old which increased to 26 years of age in 1997. In Myanmar there is not the practice of having a family name, such as seen in Western cultures.

A woman will retain her own given birth name throughout her life, whether she marries or remains single.  Typically we see women are allowed to make decisions regarding their households spendings without permission from their husbands, although males are considered the heads of the household.  It is expected that once married a woman will have children and infertility can be grounds for divorce.

In respect to the law, a woman can jointly or separately hold assets with her husband. In the case of the husband's death the women then inherits the property. In the event of divorce the assets are divided equally unless the women is dependent on her husband, in which case she receives only one-third of the previously joint property. With children in divorce it is typical for the male child to remain with the father and the female child with the mother.

Violence Against Women

Sexual assault within communities as well as rape by the Burmese military as a weapon of war and genocide all have been reported by Burmese women. Additionally trafficking of women, especially in the border regions of Myanmar, as well as domestic violence and forced sex in marriage are ongoing problems. Within individual families women express concern about the limited role opportunities besides that of servants and child-care provides. Despite legal frameworks, women hold a limited decision-making power within the family.

Ethnic Women’s Rights

There is great diversity among the 135 government-recognized ethnic groups in Myanmar, and therefore generalizations may not be applicable to every group. However, there is a consistent trend of abuses suffered by the majority of ethnic women. There are few opportunities for paid labor in rural areas, especially with the common occurrence of displacement that causes people to constantly be moving. As a result, women farmers must meet the needs of their families’ in addition to the demands of the Burmese army for rations, taxes, and labor.

This burden of farmwork and housework causes a severe toll on the health of these women. Moreover, the lack of access to healthcare, widespread malnutrition, and endemic diseases have resulted in high maternal mortality rates in the rural areas, causing an estimated 580 deaths per 100,000 women. In rural area most women do not have access to contraception or other means to control their fertility, resulting in the majority of ethnic women giving birth ten or more times, although often only half of their children live to adulthood.

A 1998 International Labour Organization (ILO) Commission of Inquiry reported that forced labor is most commonly seen in ethnic minority areas. In these areas forced labor is used a means of enforcing the army’s control over local populations. Women are usually the first in the family to engage in unpaid labor in an attempt to allow male family members to seek wage generating employment. Widows however, are especially vulnerable to forced labor as they are usually unable to pay fees that would exempt them from forced labor.

Ethnic women most commonly reside in Myanmar's border areas that are most prone to civil wars and conflict. This results in women being systematically targeted by solides for violence, particularly rape, on the basis of their ethnicity. Consistent accounts report physical and psychological abuse of ethnic women by government soldiers. This violence occurs in the form of beatings, torture, summary executions, rape and other forms of sexual violence. Additionally coerced marriages between ethnic women and soldiers are common in attempting to promote the government’s “Burmanization” program. Reports indicate that taking an ethnic bride may result in the promotion of the soldier in the armed forces.

Not all Burmese men and women have been able to vote in elections. In 2015, 1,000,000 citizens were denied the right to vote officially based on security reasons, however half of those barred from voting in the election were Muslims, largely Rohingya Muslims, and the other half were voters from other predominantly ethnic minority areas.

Ranking

The 2013 Gender Inequality Index ranked Myanmar 83rd of 187 countries in regards to continuing gender inequalities. The 2012 Social Institutions and Gender Index place the country at 44th of 86 countries and 8th out of the nine countries in East Asia and the Pacific.

Myanmar's Institutional frameworks for Gender Equality

Myanmar has multiple institutional mechanisms currently in place that serve to implement the country’s commitment to gender equality and women’s empowerment. These include the Ministry of Social Welfare, Relief and Resettlement, and the Department of Social Welfare. They serve as Burmese government’s main channels towards women’s rights.

Myanmar National Committee for Women’s Affairs 

The Myanmar National Committee for Women’s Affairs was formed on July 3, 1996 as a result of the Beijing Conference on Women. It is chaired by the Minister of Social Welfare, Relief and Resettlement. It is an interministerial policy and decision-making mechanism that has determined eight main areas of concern for the advancement of women in Myanmar: education and training of women, women and health, violence against women, women and economy the girl child, women and culture, women and environment and women and media. These eight areas are the focus of the committee.

Myanmar Women’s Affairs Federation 

The Myanmar Women’s Affairs Federation was established in 2003 and is classified as a nongovernment organization. It works along with the National Committee for Women’s Affairs to implement and follow through on a gender equality and women’s empowerment agenda that is reflective of the CEDAW and the Beijing Platform for Action goals.

Myanmar Maternal and Child Welfare Association 

Myanmar Maternal and Child Welfare Association, established in 1991, promotes the health and well-being of mothers and children with a main focus on remote villages with a lack of access to healthcare. Implemented to fulfill the requirement of the health needs in accordance with the social objective “to uplift the health, fitness and educational standards of the entire nation.”.

Myanmar Women and Children Development Foundation 

Myanmar Women and Children Development Foundation was founded on May 14, 2013. It strives to promote equal opportunities for women and children in regards to their livelihoods development, education, health, emergencies and decision making. The Foundation’s vision is to “promote happy and peaceful lives in a secure socio-economic environment for all women and children in Myanmar”. The Foundation has the goal of being seen by the international community as a non-government organization carrying out nationwide development projects for women and children.

Myanmar Women Entrepreneurs’ Association

The Myanmar Women Entrepreneurs’ Association was established in 1995. It is a nongovernment, nonprofit, nonpartisan organization with women entrepreneurs, managers and educators as its members. The Association is a member of the Union of Myanmar Federation of Chambers of Commerce and Industry. It aims “to unite and bring into focus and world attention the role and capabilities of Myanmar women entrepreneurs.”

See also 
 Women in Myanmar
 Human rights in Myanmar

References